This is a list of all the individuals that had been beatified by Pope Paul VI (r. 1963–1978) in his pontificate. The pope beatified 145 individuals.

See also
 List of people beatified by Pope John XXIII
 List of people beatified by Pope John Paul II
 List of people beatified by Pope Benedict XVI
 List of people beatified by Pope Francis

External links
Hagiography Circle
Patron Saints Index

Notes

 Later canonized on 19 June 1977.
 Later canonized on 3 May 1970.
 Later canonized on 14 October 2018.
 Later canonized on 14 October 2018.
 Later canonized on 23 October 2011.
 Later canonized on 21 October 2012.
 Later canonized on 9 October 1977.
 Later canonized on 19 May 2002.
 Later canonized on 6 May 1984.
 Later canonized on 9 April 1989.
 Later canonized on 10 October 1982.
 Later canonized on 18 April 1999.
 Later canonized on 3 June 2007.
 Later canonized on 15 May 2022.
 Later canonized on 5 October 2003.
 Later canonized on 5 October 2003.
 Later canonized on 3 December 1995.
 Later canonized on 11 October 1992.
 Later canonized on 1 November 1989.
 Later canonized on 18 October 2015.
 Later canonized on 25 October 1987.
 Later canonized on 16 October 1983.
 Later canonized on 11 December 1988.
 Later canonized on 21 October 1984.
 Later canonized on 10 December 1989.
 Later canonized on 14 October 2018.

Beatified by Pope Paul VI
Paul VI